John Dane may refer to:
 John Dane III, American Olympic sailor
 John Dane (politician), British army officer and politician in colonial Victoria, Australia